The Courtrai Chest is a oak chest which incorporates Medieval carvings depicting scenes from the Franco-Flemish War and, in particular, the Battle of the Golden Spurs at Kortrijk (Courtrai) in Flanders. The chest is among the few surviving contemporaneous depictions of those historically-significant events.

History 
The Coutrai Chest is a 17th-century oak construction but incorporates an older front-face measuring 102 cm by 71 cm, dating from the 14th century. This bears carvings in relief illustrating episodes from the Franco-Flemish War (1297–1305) from the Bruges Matins (13 May 1302) to the Battle of the Golden Spurs (11 July 1302).

The Chest was discovered around 1905 in the village of Stanton St John in Oxfordshire which was a village largely owned by New College, Oxford. Found by Warden of the College, William Archibald Spooner, on a "Warden's Progress", it was in a barn of a college tenant where it was used as a feed bin for animals. Nothing is apparently known of the circumstances in which the Chest arrived in Oxfordshire.

The Chest is kept at New College, Oxford where it is not currently on public show.

Reproduction 

A full-sized reconstruction of the original is displayed at the Kortrijk 1302 Museum in Belgium where it is known as the "Oxford Chest" (Kist van Oxford). This reproduction comprises a reconstruction of the whole chest including the stiles or legs supporting it, as would have been present in its original form, but are missing from the remains of the original.

Scenes

See also
Annals of Ghent

References

Bibliography

New College, Oxford
Chests (furniture)
Collection of the Ashmolean Museum
Franco-Flemish War
14th century in the county of Flanders